William Joseph Maharg, (March 19, 1881 – November 20, 1953) was a professional boxer that has three distinct historical connections with Major League Baseball—first, as a replacement player in the 1912 Detroit Tigers' players strike; second, for a one-game stint with the Philadelphia Phillies in 1916, and third, for his role in the 1919 Chicago Black Sox Scandal.

Replacement player for Detroit Tigers (1912)

Maharg's first appearance in baseball came on May 18, 1912.  Three days earlier, Ty Cobb jumped into the stands and attacked a handicapped heckler who had been taunting Cobb, calling him a "half-nigger".   The heckler had lost one complete hand and two fingers from the other hand in an industrial accident.  When fans yelled that the man had no hands, Cobb shouted back, "I don't care if he has no feet!"  American League president Ban Johnson witnessed the incident and suspended Cobb indefinitely.  Cobb's teammates voted to strike in support of Cobb, refusing to play until the suspension was lifted.  When Ban Johnson threatened Tigers owner Frank Navin with a $5,000 per game fine if he failed to field a team, Navin told  manager Hughie Jennings to find replacement players.

As the Tigers were on the road in Philadelphia, Jennings recruited eight replacement "Tigers" from a neighborhood in North Philadelphia. Each man was paid $25.  Maharg was one of the replacement players.  The replacement Tigers lost 24–2 to the Philadelphia Athletics.  Maharg played two innings at third base and had two assists and no errors.  He failed to reach base in his only at bat in the game.  The regular Tigers returned after a one-game strike, and Maharg's major league career was over until 1916.

Philadelphia Phillies (1916)

On October 5, 1916, Maharg resurfaced in major league baseball as an assistant trainer and driver with the Philadelphia Phillies.  Maharg was given a chance to bat in the final game of the 1916 season.  With the Braves ahead 4–1 in the 8th inning‚ Phillies manager Pat Moran put the pudgy Maharg in as a pinch hitter. Maharg grounded out and then played left field before returning to his real duties as chauffeur for Phillies catcher Bill Killefer.

After one-game, one-at-bat stints in both the American and National Leagues, Maharg ended his two-game playing career with a .000 batting average but a perfect 1.000 fielding percentage.

1919 Chicago Black Sox scandal

Maharg's third connection with major league baseball came in 1919 as he conspired to fix the 1919 World Series—the infamous Black Sox Scandal.  Several White Sox players, including Eddie Cicotte, Chick Gandil, and Swede Risberg, conspired with Sleepy Bill Burns, a former big-league pitcher, to throw the World Series in exchange for $100,000. Maharg worked with Burns to find financing, approaching New York gambler Arnold Rothstein to raise the money for the players. Other gamblers soon entered the picture, and Maharg and Burns suffered multiple double-crosses. The White Sox did in fact lose the Series.

In September 1920, a disgruntled Maharg gave the full details of the plot to a Philadelphia writer.  Eight White Sox players were indicted for throwing the Series.  When Maharg was called as a witness in the criminal trial, someone noted, “He flashed enough diamonds on his fingers to buy a flock of autos.”  

Maharg was asked, “Are you a ballplayer named “Peaches Graham?”  The answer was, “No!  I have never been anything but Billy Maharg.  I know Graham, but I am not he.”  Peaches Graham was four years older than Maharg, five inches taller, and surviving photographs of Graham do not in any way resemble Maharg. It has also long been incorrectly alleged, including in "Eight Men Out", the Eliot Asinof book about the scandal, that Maharg's real name was Graham, or Maharg spelled backwards; however, his father is clearly shown in the 1900 Census as George Maharg, and appears also as "George Maharg" in Censuses prior to Billy Maharg's birth.

The Chicago jury found the eight players not guilty, and Maharg celebrated with the players afterward.  All eight were subsequently banned from baseball for life by Commissioner Kenesaw Mountain Landis.

Three of the former players implicated in the Black Sox Scandal were members of the 1912 Detroit Tigers: Sleepy Bill Burns and Jean Dubuc were both pitchers for the 1912 Tigers, and Maharg was one of the 1912 replacement Tigers.

Actor Richard Edson played the part of Maharg in John Sayles's 1988 film Eight Men Out.

He died in Philadelphia on November 20, 1953 and was interred at Holy Sepulchre Cemetery in Cheltenham Township, Pennsylvania.

References

Further reading
 Philadelphia Athletics Historical Society Article on Maharg
 Chatterfromthedugout Bio of Maharg

External links
 
 

1881 births
1953 deaths
Detroit Tigers players
Philadelphia Phillies players
Boxers from Philadelphia
Baseball players from Philadelphia
Burials at Holy Sepulchre Cemetery